Newtonville is an unincorporated community in Hammond Township, Spencer County, in the U.S. state of Indiana.

History
Newtonville was platted in 1865 by Bezaleel Newton and others.

A post office was established at Newtonville in 1860, and remained in operation until it was discontinued in 1984.

Geography

References

Unincorporated communities in Spencer County, Indiana
Unincorporated communities in Indiana